Uniontown Mall is a regional enclosed shopping mall in South Union Township, Fayette County, Pennsylvania, just outside the city of Uniontown. The anchor stores are JCPenney, TTEC, Crown Antique Mall and Crossfit Uniontown. There are four vacant anchor stores that were once The Bon-Ton, Sears and Burlington Coat Factory, as well as AMC Theatres, which departed abruptly in mid 2021.

History 
The one-story Uniontown Mall was developed by Crown American and opened in 1972. Sears and Gee Bee were the mall's original anchor stores. A Bon-Ton store opened at the mall in 1975, and JCPenney and Hess's followed later. In 1992, the Gee Bee store became Value City.

In 1999, the Hess's store closed and was eventually divided between a Timeless Traditions furniture store and a branch of TeleTech (TTEC), which specializes in providing customer service and telemarketing for various businesses.  In 2003, the property was acquired by Pennsylvania Real Estate Investment Trust (PREIT) as part of the merger with Crown American.  In 2007, Value City closed but later became Burlington Coat Factory.

By 2008, it had four anchor tenants – Burlington Coat Factory, JCPenney, Sears, and the Bon-Ton – but in a few years, the mall would see multiple closures.

In January 2015, PREIT announced plans to sell the Uniontown Mall, along with four other malls. The mall's sale to Mason Asset Management and Namdar Realty Group was completed in August 2015.

In March 2017, Sears closed followed by The Bon-Ton closing in August 2018. In January 2019, Burlington announced to not renew their lease. Two other major tenants, Dunham's Sports and Timeless Traditions Furniture, closed in January 2019. Timeless Traditions Furniture moved to a nearby building that was formerly a Super Kmart. In mid 2021, AMC Theatres abruptly closed and currently remains vacant as of August 2021.

Today, the mall remains a main commercial attraction for South Union Township, currently attracting new tenants with the addition of local businesses and community services, as well as entertainment options such as a new Nerf gun course located in a former storefront, as well as an arcade and several new restaurants.

References

External links 

Bradley's Book Outlet

Shopping malls in Metro Pittsburgh
Shopping malls in Pennsylvania
Shopping malls established in 1972
Namdar Realty Group